Selene peruviana, the Peruvian moonfish or Pacific moonfish, is a species of jack in the family Carangidae. It is found in the eastern Pacific Ocean.

Distribution and habitat
The Peruvian moonfish is found in the eastern Pacific Ocean. Its range extends from the southern California in the United States to central South America.

Description
Adults of this species can grow up to  TL but usually grow up to  FL.

References

peruviana
Fish of Peru
Western South American coastal fauna
Fish described in 1866